Goun Duk-Yong (Hangul: 권덕용, Hanja: 權德龍; born August 29, 1962 in Jeonju, Jeollabuk-do) is a retired South Korean Greco-Roman wrestler.

External links
Goun Duk-Yong's profile from sports-references

1962 births
Living people
South Korean wrestlers
Olympic wrestlers of South Korea
Wrestlers at the 1988 Summer Olympics
Wrestlers at the 1992 Summer Olympics
South Korean male sport wrestlers
Asian Games medalists in wrestling
Wrestlers at the 1990 Asian Games
World Wrestling Championships medalists
Asian Games gold medalists for South Korea
Medalists at the 1990 Asian Games
People from Jeonju
Sportspeople from North Jeolla Province
20th-century South Korean people